2001 Italian Open women's doubles took place May 14–20, 2001.

Lisa Raymond and Rennae Stubbs were the reigning champions. They did not defend their title.

Cara Black and Elena Likhovtseva won in the final 6–1, 6–1 against Paola Suárez and Patricia Tarabini.

Seeds

Draw

Finals

Top half

Bottom half

External links
 Draws

Women's Doubles
Italian Open - Doubles